Exerodonta is a genus of frogs in the family Hylidae. This genus was resurrected in 2005 following a major revision of the Hylidae . Eleven species  previously placed in the genus Hyla were moved to this genus. They are endemic to south-central Mexico.

Species

External links
 . 2007. Amphibian Species of the World: an Online Reference. Version 5.1 (10 October 2007). Exerodonta. Electronic Database accessible at https://web.archive.org/web/20071024033938/http://research.amnh.org/herpetology/amphibia/index.php. American Museum of Natural History, New York, USA. (Accessed: Apr 21, 2008). 
  [web application]. 2008. Berkeley, California: Exerodonta. AmphibiaWeb, available at http://amphibiaweb.org/. (Accessed: Apr 21, 2008). 

 
Hylinae
Amphibian genera
Taxa named by Paul Brocchi